USNS Carson City (JHSV-7/T-EPF-7), (ex-Courageous) is the seventh , currently in service with the United States Navys Military Sealift Command. She is the second ship in naval service named after Carson City, Nevada.

Carson City was built by Austal USA in Mobile, Alabama. The ship was christened at the Austal USA shipyards in Mobile on 16 January 2016.

Design

Carson City is a shallow draft aluminum catamaran with a flight deck for helicopter operations, and a loading ramp to enable vehicles to quickly drive on and off the ship. The ramp is designed to accommodate the limited piers and quay walls often encountered in developing countries.

Operational history
In 2018 Carson City participated in the annual BALTOPS naval exercise in the Baltic Sea. Carson City deployed REMUS 100 and 600 autonomous underwater vehicles to conduct counter-mine warfare exercises and acted as a command post; coordinating and facilitating allied movements and communications. In July and August  2019, NAVAF deployed USNS Carson City — one of an unusual and relatively recent class of logistics ships called expeditionary fast transports — to the Gulf of Guinea; Senegal, Cote d’Ivoire, Ghana, Nigeria, and Cabo Verde.

USNS Carson City became the first US Navy ship to visit Port Sudan since the founding of U.S. Africa Command on 24 February 2021.

References

External links

Transports of the United States Navy
Ships built in Mobile, Alabama
Spearhead-class Joint High Speed Vessels
2016 ships